David Mercier Parsons was born in Villa Rica, Georgia, and is an American author, poet, and educator. Raised in Austin, Texas, he was named by the Texas State Legislature in 2011 to a one-year term as Poet Laureate of Texas, commemorated by the publication of David M. Parsons New & Selected Poems by the Texas Christian University Press.  His most recent book is the poetry collection Reaching for Longer Water (Texas Review Press). Parsons holds a BBA from Texas State University and an MA from the University of Houston’s Creative Writing Program where he studied poetry and literature with Edward Hirsch, Stanley Plumly, Richard Howard, Robert Pinsky and Howard Moss.  

Parsons is a professor at Lone Star College-Montgomery where he teaches English and Creative Writing.  He is a founder and program director of Writers in Performance, a monthly reading series in partnership with the non-profit Montgomery County Literary Arts Council which he founded and co-directs.   The Commissioners Court of Montgomery County, Texas, named him County Poet Laureate in 2005 for a five-year term.  In 2013, the City of Conroe, Texas, recognized Parsons with a bronze bust in the town’s Founders Plaza.  In 2019, his poem, “The Texian,” was installed in bronze at Lone Star Monument & Historical Flag Park in Conroe, Texas.

Every year since 1994 Parsons has hosted birthday celebrations in Conroe, Texas, for the poets Emily Dickinson and Walt Whitman featuring presentations from scholars and readings by regional and nationally recognized poets. Scholar Michael Robertson notes the yearly Whitman gathering in his work Worshiping Walt: The Whitman Disciples (Princeton University Press).

Parsons served in the United States Marine Corps both active duty and Reserve for eight years, becoming a Squad Leader and Recon Boat Team Leader. He developed a creative writing course specifically for veterans and their families at Lone Star College-Montgomery in 2015.

Charles Ealy, writing in the Austin American Statesman, says of the collection Reaching for Longer Water "David M. Parsons . . . takes us back to the Austin of his youth in his latest collection of verse. But he writes about his youth with a striking clarity that veers far from sentimentality."

Poet Ange Mlinko writes of Parsons and his work, “It is deeply informed by English and American literature. There is no artificial barrier between art and life, love and intellect. The Renaissance man was once a courtly ideal; Parsons shows that it is a democratic ideal too—warm-blooded, muscular, as companionable on the page as in the flesh.”

Parsons was elected to membership in the Texas Institute of Letters in 2009.

Works 
 Editing Sky, (Texas Review Press, 1999.  )
 Color of Mourning, (Texas Review Press, 2005. )
 Feathering Deep, (Texas Review Press, 2012 )
 David M. Parsons New & Selected Poems, (Texas Christian University Press, 2012. )
 Reaching for Longer Water, (Texas Review Press, 2015. )
 Far Out: Poems of the 60’s, (co-edited with Wendy Barker), (Wings Press, 2016. )

Honors and awards 
 San Miguel Literary Salo, Featured Poet, San Miguel, Mexico, 2017
 Lamar University MFA Program, Featured Poet, Beaumont, Texas, 2015
 Lone Star College System Writing Award, 2012
 2011 Texas State Poet Laureate, Texas Commission on the Arts, Texas Legislature
 Final Judge, 2010 Robert Phillips Chapbook Competition, Texas Review Press
 Dave Parsons Day, Conroe City Council, 2011
 Acclaimed Poet Laureate for Montgomery County 2005-2010 (Montgomery County, Texas, Commissioner’s Court)
 Elected to The Texas Institute of Letters, 2009
 Houston Arts Alliance Panel, Individual Artist Jury, Creative Writing, 2008
 Houston Arts Alliance Panel, Creative Writing, 2007
 North Harris Montgomery County College District Writing Award, 2006
 Baskerville Publishers Poetry Prize, descant (Texas Christian University), 2006
 North Harris Montgomery County College District Writing Award, 2005
 North Harris Montgomery County College District Writing Award, 2001
 2000 Violet Crown Book Award Special Citation, 2000
 1999 Texas Review Poetry Prize
 Finalist 1998 X.J. Kennedy Poetry Competition
 Founder /Chairman Montgomery County Literary Arts Council, 1993–98, Chairman 2000-2003
 Finalist 1997 South & Southwestern Poetry Breakthrough Series
 Elected by faculty to Willis High School Site-based Management Team, 1993–99
 French-American Legation Poetry Prize, 1987
 Joined United States Marine Corps April, 1961; active duty until January, 1962; Reserve duty until Honorable Discharge, 1969
 Honorary Admiral In The Texas Navy, Governor Price Daniel, 1957
 Honorary Texan, Governor Alan Shivers, 1955

References 

Year of birth missing (living people)
Living people
People from Villa Rica, Georgia
American male poets
Poets from Texas
Texas State University alumni
University of Houston alumni
Poets Laureate of Texas